Mohammad Naderi (born 1978) is an Iranian actor, director, writer and voice actor. He is known for his roles in Dorehami and Shamdooni. He created the doll of Jenab Khan.

Series and Movies
The Enigma of the Shah, 2015
Dorehami, 2016
Shamduni, 2014
Khandevane, 2017–2019
Hezarpa, 2017
Pastarioni, 2018
Dang o fange roozegar, 2018–2019

Series (As a writer and Voice actor)
Morvarid Alley, 2013–2014 (writer & voice actor)

References

External links

1978 births
Living people
Iranian comedians
People from Tehran
Iranian male actors
Soore University alumni
Iranian male film actors
Iranian male stage actors
Iranian male television actors
20th-century Iranian male actors
21st-century Iranian male actors